Events from the year 1230 in Ireland.

Incumbent
Lord: Henry III

Events

First records of the Franciscan Order in Ireland.

Births
 Walter de Burgh, 1st Earl of Ulster

Deaths

References

 
1230s in Ireland
Ireland
Years of the 13th century in Ireland